Ashley Gisele Mulheron (born 8 February 1983) is a Scottish actress and television presenter. Mulheron trained as an actress on the one-year course at Central School of Speech and Drama in London. Mulheron was in the British Comedy Horror Lesbian Vampire Killers 2009, opposite James Corden and Mathew Horne. Mulheron also starred in The Bang Bang Club.

Personal life
She is the sister of Tiffany Mulheron.

Filmography

References

External links
 
 
 
 

1983 births
Living people
Scottish television presenters
Place of birth missing (living people)
Scottish film actresses
Scottish television actresses
Scottish women television presenters